The Cungrea is a right tributary of the river Cungrișoara in Romania. It flows into the Cungrișoara in the village Cungrea.

References

Rivers of Romania
Rivers of Olt County